33 Revolutions per Minute is Marxman's debut album, released in the United Kingdom on 1 April 1993, with a slightly modified version being released in the United States the following year. Three singles were released in the UK from the album – the double A side "Dark are the Days" and "Sad Affair", the latter of which was banned by the BBC due to its Irish Republican lyrics, "Ship Ahoy" and finally "All About Eve", which was the group's greatest commercial success reaching number 28 in the UK Singles Chart.

Track Listing (UK) 
The album featured a number of different producers, and also contributions by established artists such as Sinéad O'Connor. All tracks were scratched by DJ K One except track 9, scratched by DJ Premier.

Credits 
Tracks 2, 3, 4, 5 and 10 were produced by Adam Fuest, tracks 1, 8 and 11 by Demus, tracks 6, 8 and 12 by Leroy Quintyn, track 9 by Gang Starr and track 7 by Stimulated Dummies.

References 

1993 debut albums
Marxman albums
Albums produced by DJ Premier
Talkin' Loud albums